The Early Acid Mothers Temple Recordings 1995–1997 is a compilation of recordings by Acid Mothers Temple & the Melting Paraiso U.F.O. released in 2007 by Synesthetic Recordings.

The compilation was released as a double LP (SYRE 011) in a limited edition of 408 copies. A special Triple Trip Edition (SYRETRIPP 011) including a third bonus LP and a poster, limited to only 100 copies, was issued at the same time. A double CD version (SYRE 012) is planned for release in 2011.

The compilation features the first sessions of the band, recorded at Acid Mothers Temple from 1995 to 1997. Disc 1 was originally released as Acid Mothers Temple & The Melting Paraiso U.F.O. 1 (AMT-001) and disc 2 originally released as Acid Mothers Temple & The Melting Paraiso U.F.O. 2 (AMT-002), two companion cassettes issued by the Acid Mothers Temple label in February 1997 in limited editions of 50 copies each.

The bonus material on disc 3 was recorded at Acid Mothers Temple from 1995 to 1996 and originally released on Acid Mother's Temple & The Melting Paraiso U.F.O., a cassette issued in 1996 in a limited edition of 10 copies. The cassette also featured a track called "Psycho Line", but it was considered to be of inferior musical value and was omitted from this reissue on the request of band leader Kawabata Makoto.

Most of the songs were later released in different forms on the band's eponymous debut album and other recordings.

Track listing

Disc 1: Acid Mothers Temple & The Melting Paraiso U.F.O. 1

Side A:
 "From The Melting Paraiso U.F.O." (Wellens/Cotton/Kawabata) – 3:56
 "The Acid Mothers Prayer" (Cotton/Kawabata) – 8:38
 "Amphetamine A Go Go" (Kawabata) – 4:55
 "Aum Over Drive" (Kawabata) – 3:27

Side B:
 "Speed Guru" (Wellens/Kawabata) – 19:51

Disc 2: Acid Mothers Temple & The Melting Paraiso U.F.O. 2

Side C:
 L: "Zen Feedbacker" (Kawabata) / R: "Candy Aum" (Kawabata) – 3:14
 "Pink Lady Lemonade" (Kawabata) – 12:54
 "Tibetan Esoteric Rage" (Kawabata) – 5:44

Side D:
 "Aunt Ema Blues" (Cotton/Kawabata/Suhara) ~ "Glutton For Punishment" (Cotton/Kawabata) – 6:18
 "Rolling Buzz Fuzz Fucker" (Wellens/Kawabata/Suhara) – 5:00
 "Satori LSD" (Kawabata/Higashi/Suhara/Takahashi) – 8:29

Disc 3: Acid Mother's Temple & The Melting Paraiso U.F.O.

Side E:
 "Freak Out Mu" (Cotton/Kawabata/Suhara) – 18:20

Side F:
 "Speed Guru" (Kawabata) – 19:39

This disc was only included in the special Triple Trip Edition of the compilation.

Personnel

Discs 1 and 2
 Cotton Casino – voices, sitar, synthesizer
 Suhara Keizo – bass
 Momo – bass
 Higashi Hiroshi – guitar
 Koizumi Hajime – drums, percussion, saxophone
 Takahashi Atsuki – drums
 Yasuda Hisashi – percussion
 Sakakibara Daiji – didgeridoo
 Mano Kazuhiko – saxophone
 Ishida Yoko – violin
 Johan Wellens – cosmic narration
 Kawabata Makoto – guitar, synthesizer, sarangi, harmonium, bagpipe, organ, voices, producer, engineer, liner notes
 Bjørn Kjetil Johansen – cover design
 Petter Flaten Eilertsen – liner notes
 Alan Cummings – translator

Disc 3
 Cotton Casino – voices, synthesizer
 Suhara Keizou – bass
 Momo – bass
 Higashi Hiroshi – guitar
 Koizumi Hajime – drums, percussion, saxophone
 Mano Kazuhiko – saxophone
 Kawabata Makoto – guitar, synthesizer, producer, engineer

External links
 Synesthetic Recordings info page for standard edition
 Synesthetic Recordings info page for Triple Trip Edition

Acid Mothers Temple albums
2007 compilation albums